Soul Man is a 1986 American comedy film directed by Steve Miner and written by Carol L. Black. C. Thomas Howell stars as a white law student who pretends to be black in order to qualify for a scholarship. Its title refers to the song of the same name by Isaac Hayes and David Porter; the original soundtrack includes a version performed by Sam Moore and Lou Reed.

The film gained controversy due to Howell's makeup drawing comparisons to blackface, prompting protests against its release. Despite the controversy and negative reviews from critics, Soul Man was a commercial success, grossing $35 million on a $4.5 million budget.

Plot
Mark Watson is the pampered son of a rich family who is about to attend Harvard Law School along with his best friend Gordon. Unfortunately, his father's neurotic psychiatrist talks his patient into focusing on his own happiness instead of spending money on his son. Faced with the prospect of having to pay for law school by himself, Mark decides to apply for a scholarship, but the only suitable one is for African Americans only. He decides to cheat by using tanning pills in a larger dose than prescribed to appear as an African American. Watson then sets out for Harvard, naïvely believing that black people have no problems at all in American society.

However, once immersed in a black student's life, Mark finds out prejudice and racism truly exists. He meets a young African American student named Sarah Walker, whom he at first only flirts with; gradually, however, he genuinely falls in love with her. In passing, she mentions that he received the scholarship she was in the running for at the last minute. Due to this, she not only has to handle her classes but work as a waitress to support herself and her young son George.

Slowly, Mark begins to regret his decision as he continues to experience problems because of his skin tone. He gets arrested by a cop who assumes that he is a thief because he is driving an expensive car, is put on the receiving end of many hurtful racial stereotypes by white people and finds himself subjected to sexual harassment by his landlord's daughter, Whitney, who is eager to explore what she perceives to be the "exotic" thrill of sleeping with a black man. 

After a chaotic day in which Sarah, his parents (who are not aware of his double life), and Whitney all make surprise visits at the same time, Mark drops the charade and publicly reveals himself to be white. He is surprised to find that many are willing to forgive him for the charade after considering his reasons for doing so, but Sarah is furious. Mark has a private conversation with his professor. He has learned more than he bargained for, admitting that he still doesn't know what it is like to be black because he could have changed back to being white at any time.

Because Mark must forfeit his scholarship, his father agrees to loan him the money for school, but with exorbitant interest. He goes to Sarah and begs for another chance, to which she agrees after Mark stands up for her and George when two male students tell a racist joke in front of them.

Cast

Production
Producer Steve Tisch offered the role of Mark Watson to Anthony Michael Hall, Tim Robbins, Anthony Edwards, Val Kilmer and John Cusack, all of whom declined. Howell later said, "when I made the movie, I didn't go into it with the idea that I had a responsibility to sort of teach America a lesson. I went into it because it was a great script. It was so well-written, so funny, and—sadly—very true. A lot of the experiences this guy goes through, maybe he wouldn't have gone through them if he was a white person, but when he's black, it's a very different experience."

Ron Reagan, son of then-president Ronald Reagan and first lady Nancy Reagan, had a small role in the film.

Reception

Controversy
The film was widely criticized for its use of make-up to make a white actor appear African American, which many compared to blackface. Members of the NAACP spoke out against the film and an African-American student group at UCLA organized a picket of a cinema screening Soul Man.

NAACP Chapter President Willis Edwards said in a statement at the time, "We certainly believe it is possible to use humor to reveal the ridiculousness of racism. However the unhumorous and quite seriously made plot point of Soul Man is that no black student could be found in all of Los Angeles who was academically qualified for a scholarship geared to blacks."

In defending the film, producer Steve Tisch said it was like Tootsie (1982) which featured a man masquerading as a woman for career advancement. "It used comedy as a device to expose sexual stereotyping. I think Soul Man uses it to explode racial stereotyping."

The film was seen by President Ronald and Nancy Reagan at Camp David. "The Reagans enjoyed the film and especially enjoyed seeing their son Ron," a White House spokesman said at the time.

Critical reception
Controversy aside, the film was panned by critics. It has a score of only 13% on Rotten Tomatoes from 23 reviews. Roger Ebert gave Soul Man one out of four stars, writing that the main premise "is a genuinely interesting idea, filled with dramatic possibilities, but the movie approaches it on the level of a dim-witted sitcom."

Box office
Despite the controversy, the film was a box office success. On its opening weekend, it debuted at No. 3 behind Crocodile Dundee and The Color of Money with $4.4 million. In total, Soul Man went on to gross $27.8 million domestically.

Soundtrack

Charts

Music video 
A music video for the title track was released for the Sam & Dave song "Soul Man" performed by Sam Moore and Lou Reed.  The video starred actors Bruce Willis, Cybill Shepherd, Rae Dawn Chong, C. Thomas Howell, Ron Reagan Jr., George Segal, Jamie Farr, boxer Ray Mancini and the children's character Gumby, all lip synching to the song. Soul Man executive producer Steve Tisch got the actors to do the cameos.

Legacy 

Actress Rae Dawn Chong later defended the film, saying of the controversy:

Spike Lee responded by saying, "In my film career, any comment or criticism has never been based on jealousy."

"A white man donning blackface is taboo," said C. Thomas Howell. "Conversation over — you can't win. But our intentions were pure: We wanted to make a funny movie that had a message about racism."

Howell later expanded:

I’m shocked at how truly harmless that movie is, and how the anti-racial message involved in it is so prevalent... This isn’t a movie about blackface. This isn’t a movie that should be considered irresponsible on any level... It’s very funny... It made me much more aware of the issues we face on a day-to-day basis, and it made me much more sensitive to racism... It’s an innocent movie, it’s got innocent messages, and it’s got some very, very deep messages. And I think the people that haven’t seen it that judge it are horribly wrong. I think that’s more offensive than anything. Judging something you haven’t seen is the worst thing you can really do. In fact, Soul Man sort of represents that all the way through. I think it’s a really innocent movie with a very powerful message, and it’s an important part of my life. I’m proud of the performance, and I’m proud of the people that were in it.  A lot of people ask me today, “Could that movie be made today?"... Robert Downey Jr. just did it in Tropic Thunder!... The difference is that he was just playing a character in Tropic Thunder, and there was no magnifying glass on racism, which is so prevalent in our country. I guess that’s what makes people more uncomfortable about Soul Man. But I think it’s an important movie.

Downey Jr. cited C. Thomas Howell and Soul Man when addressing the potential controversy over his role in Tropic Thunder: "At the end of the day, it's always about how well you commit to the character. If I didn't feel [the role in Tropic Thunder] was morally sound, or that it would be easily misinterpreted that I'm just C. Thomas Howell [in Soul Man], I would've stayed home."

Defunct mathcore band Botch has a track named "C. Thomas Howell as the 'Soul Man'" on their release We Are the Romans.

Home media
Soul Man was released on DVD on March 19, 2002, by Anchor Bay Entertainment. Special Features included a theatrical and teaser trailer, along with an audio commentary by director Steve Miner and C.Thomas Howell.

It was released again by Anchor Bay Entertainment as a double feature along with Fraternity Vacation on November 20, 2007.

On October 20, 2011, it was released again as a double feature by Image Entertainment along with 18 Again!

References

External links 
 
 
 

Review of film at Vice Magazine
Review of film  at New York Times

1986 films
1986 comedy films
1986 controversies in the United States
1980s teen comedy films
African-American-related controversies in film
American teen comedy films
1980s English-language films
Films about interracial romance
Films about race and ethnicity
Films directed by Steve Miner
Films scored by Tom Scott
Films set in Harvard University
Films set in Massachusetts
Films shot in Massachusetts
Harvard Law School
New World Pictures films
1980s American films